Fiction Factory Films, also known as Fiction Factory, is a television production company based in Cardiff.

Since 2005 it has produced over 140 hours of drama for BBC, ITV, Channel 5 and S4C, and has earned over 70 nominations and awards, from BAFTA and Celtic Film Festival to the Rose d’Or Prix Europa, with distribution to over 80 countries.

The company achieved a notable success with "Hinterland/ Y Gwyll". Filmed in two language versions, Welsh and English, it was seen in 150 countries. On the showing of its first season it was reviewed favourably.

Productions

References

External links
Fiction Factory – main website

Tinopolis
Mass media companies of Wales
Television in Wales
Television production companies of the United Kingdom
Privately held companies of the United Kingdom
Companies based in Cardiff